A passenger locator form (PLF) is a form used by some countries to obtain information about incoming passengers prior to international travel. It typically requests contact, journey, and stay details.
It may take the form of a physical document, or be entirely electronic and contain little more than a barcode.

Ireland
During the COVID-19 pandemic, Ireland required incoming travellers to complete a Passenger Locator Form. This requirement was withdrawn with effect from Sunday 6 March 2022.

United Kingdom
During the COVID-19 pandemic, the UK Government required incoming travellers to complete a passenger locator form. This requirement was withdrawn with effect from 4 a.m. on Friday 18 March 2022.

References

Identity documents
International travel documents